Walking on Eggshells is the second studio album by Paddy Milner, released on 2004-10-25.

Recorded mainly at Gallery Studios with encouragement from the studio's owner and Roxy Music guitarist Phil Manzanera. Taken from the album, the first single Unsquare Dance is an arrangement of Dave Brubeck's classic, and has received accolades all around; Brubeck himself said, "I love it, wouldn't change a note". 

The video to the single "You Think You're So Damn Funny" gained coverage on French and German T.V., helping to propel the album to the No. 1 Bestselling Jazz/Blues album in France in May 2005. As well as Paddy's songs and arrangements, the album features five songs co-written with lyricist Pete Brown, most well known for his collaborations with Cream.

Track listing
 "Walking on Eggshells"
 "You Think You're So Damn Funny"
 "After the Rain"
 "Unsquare Dance"
 "Run For Cover"
 "Dreamtime"
 "Rollin' & Tumblin'"
 "Can't Escape the Song"
 "Lazy Monday"
 "Falling For the Moon"
 "I Live the Life I Love"
 "Beware of the Groove"
 "Back to the Real World"
 "The Awakening"

2004 albums
Paddy Milner albums
Bronze Records albums